Massenya is a small town in Chad. It is the capital of the region of Chari-Baguirmi and of the department of Baguirmi.

Massenya was also the historical capital of the Kingdom of Baguirmi and the seat of the Mbang, or Sultan.

The town is served by Massenya Airport.

Latitude : 11.400°N - Longitude : 16.170°E

Chari-Baguirmi Region
Populated places in Chad